Rafael Romero (born 30 May 1968) is a Dominican Republic boxer. He competed in the men's light welterweight event at the 1992 Summer Olympics.

References

1968 births
Living people
Dominican Republic male boxers
Olympic boxers of the Dominican Republic
Boxers at the 1992 Summer Olympics
Place of birth missing (living people)
Light-welterweight boxers